Hermetia illucens, the black soldier fly, is a common and widespread fly of the family Stratiomyidae. Since the late 20th century H. illucens has increasingly been gaining attention because of its usefulness for recycling organic waste and generating animal feed.

Distribution 

This species is native to the Neotropical realm, but in recent decades has spread across all continents, becoming virtually cosmopolitan. It is present in most of the United States and Europe, including the Iberian Peninsula, southern France, Italy, Croatia, Malta, the Canary Islands, and Switzerland, on the Black Sea coast of Russia in the Krasnodar Territory. It can also be found in the Afrotropical realm, the Australasian realm, the east Palaearctic realm, the Nearctic realm, North Africa, Southern Africa, and the Indomalayan realm.

Description 

These medium-sized flies have a predominantly black body, with metallic reflections ranging from blue to green on the thorax and sometimes with a reddish end of the abdomen. The second abdominal tergite has translucent areas, from which the specific Latin epithet derives. The head is wide, with very developed eyes. The antennae are about twice the length of the head. The legs are black with whitish tarsi. The wings are membranous; at rest, they are folded horizontally on the abdomen and overlapped.

H. illucens is a mimic fly, very close in size, color, and appearance to the organ pipe mud dauber wasp and its relatives. The mimicry of this particular kind of wasp is especially enhanced in that the fly's antennae are elongated and wasp-like, the fly's hind tarsi are pale, as are the wasp's, and the fly has two small transparent "windows" in the basal abdominal segments that make the fly appear to have a narrow "wasp waist". Black soldier fly larvae can be differentiated from blowfly or housefly larvae by a thin gray-black stripe on their posterior ends.

Lifecycle 

An adult female lays between 206 and 639 eggs at a time. These eggs are typically deposited in crevices or on surfaces above or adjacent to decaying matter such as manure or compost and hatch in about 4 days. The larvae are able to feed on a wide variety of organic matter, adapting to diets with different nutrient content. The larval stage lasts from 18 to 36 days, depending on the food substrates provided to the larvae, of which the postfeeding (prepupal) stage lasts around 7 days. The length of larval stage can be delayed by months due to low temperature or lack of food. The pupal stage lasts from 1 to 2 weeks. Adults can live typically 47 to 73 days when provided with water and food, such as sugar in captivity or nectar in the wild, or survive for about 8 to 10 days on fat reserves gathered during larval stage when water is provided.

Human relevance and use 
The larvae and adults are considered neither pests nor vectors. Instead, black soldier fly larvae play a role similar to that of redworms as essential decomposers in breaking down organic substrates and returning nutrients to the soil. The larvae have voracious appetites and can be used for composting household food scraps and agricultural waste products.

Additionally, black soldier fly larvae (BSFL) are an alternative source of protein for aquaculture, animal feed, pet food and human nutrition.

The larvae are produced and processed in industrial-scale insect factories globally by biotechnology companies such as InnovaFeed and Protix, the latter operating the world's largest insect factory in the Netherlands.

As decomposers / in composting 
Black soldier fly larvae (BSFL) are used to compost waste or convert the waste into animal feed.  The wastes include fresh manure and food wastes of both animal and vegetable origin. Fly larvae are among the most efficient animals at converting biomass into feed.

When the larvae have completed their larval development through six instars, they enter a stage called the "prepupa" wherein they cease to eat, and they tend to migrate toward cool, dark, and dry substrates to pupate. This prepupal migration instinct is used by grub composting bins to self-harvest the mature larvae. These containers have ramps or holes on the sides to allow the prepupae to climb out of the composter and drop into a collection area.

Larvae are beneficial in these ways:

Their large size relative to houseflies and blowflies allows them to prevent houseflies and blowflies from laying eggs in decaying matter by consuming larvae of other species. This matters because compost systems inhabited by houseflies and blowflies carry a much greater stench than systems inhabited by BSFL, making H. illucens a more human-friendly way to minimize food waste.
They are not a pest to humans. Unlike houseflies, adult black soldier flies have greatly-reduced sponging mouthparts and can only consume liquids such as flower nectar or do not eat at all. They do not regurgitate food along with digestive enzymes like houseflies, thus do not spread diseases.
They are not attracted to human habitation or foods. As a detritivore and coprovore, the egg-bearing females are attracted to rotting food or manure.
Black soldier flies do not fly around as much as houseflies. They have less expendable energy due to their limited ability to consume food as adults. They are very easy to catch and relocate when they get inside a house, as they do not avoid being picked up, they are sanitary, and they neither bite nor sting. Their only defense seems to be hiding. When using a wet grub bin that will collect or kill all the pupae, the black soldier fly population is easy to reduce by killing the pupae/prepupae in the collection container, before they become flies. They may be killed by freezing, drying, manually feeding to domestic animals, putting the collection container in a chicken coop for automatic feeding, or feeding to wild birds with a mouse/pest-proof feeder.
Significant reductions of E. coli 0157:H7 and Salmonella enterica were measured in hen manure after larvae activity was added onto the manure.
They quickly reclaim would-be pollutants: Nine organic chemicals were greatly reduced or eliminated from manure in 24 hours.
They quickly reduce the volume and weight of would-be waste: The larval colony breaks apart its food, churns it, and creates heat, increasing compost evaporation. Significant amounts are also converted to carbon dioxide respired by the grubs and symbiotic/mutualistic microorganisms. BSFL in a compost system typically reduce the volume of compost by around 50%.

Aside from the protein production, fly larvae also produce another valuable resource called frass. Fly larval frass is a granulated and odorless residue that can be used as organic fertilizer directly or through conversion by earthworms.

Recent research in the field of entomoremediation shows the potential of this insect for purification of biomass contaminated with heavy metals.

As feed 
Black soldier fly larvae are used as feed. The harvested pupae and prepupae are eaten by poultry, fish, pigs, lizards, turtles, and even dogs. The insect is one of the few insect species approved to be used as feed in aquaculture in the EU.

At the pupal stage, black soldier flies are at their nutritional peak.

As human food 
Records of human consumption of Hermetia illucens are difficult to find.

In 2013, Austrian designer Katharina Unger invented a table-top insect-breeding farm called "Farm 432" in which people can produce edible fly larvae at home. It is a multichambered plastic machine that looks like a kitchen appliance and can produce  of larvae or two meals in a week.

The taste of the larvae is said to be very distinctive. Unger: "When you cook them, they smell a bit like cooked potatoes. The consistency is a bit harder on the outside and like soft meat on the inside. The taste is nutty and a bit meaty.

For producing grease 
Black soldier fly larvae can be used to produce grease. The grease is usable in the pharmaceutical industry (cosmetics, surfactants for shower gel) thereby replacing other vegetable oils such as palm oil, or it can be used in fodder.

For producing chitin 
Black soldier fly larvae can be used to produce chitin. Chitin is used in shipping as an alternative against biofouling. It is also used in water purification. Chitin also has a good potential as soil amendment, to improve soil fertility and plant resilience.

For producing organic plant fertilizer 
The residues from the decomposition process (frass) by the larvae comprise larval faeces, shed larval exoskeletons and undigested material. Frass is one of the main products from commercial black soldier fly rearing. The chemical profile of the frass varies with the substrate the larvae feed on. However in general it is considered a versatile organic plant fertilizer due to a favorable ratio of three major plant nutrients Nitrogen, Phosphorus and Potassium. The frass is commonly applied by direct mixing with soil and considered a long-term fertilizer with slow nutrient release. However plant trials found also short-term fertilizing effects comparable to fast acting, synthetic fertilizers.   Next to its nutrient provision the frass can carry further components that are beneficial for soil fertility and soil health. One of them is the soil improver chitin which gets via chitin-rich shed exoskeletons of the larvae into the frass. Moreover the frass from black soldier fly rearing applied as a fertilizer can effectively alter the soil microbial community composition which plays a crucial role for soil fertility. 

It is an ongoing debate whether the frass from black soldier fly larvae rearing can be used as a fertilizer in a fresh state or has to undergo further composting before its application. There are assumptions that further composting would lead to the reduction of potential phytotoxic properties. In the European Union insect frass has to be treated for one hour at 70 degrees Celsius before commercialization for safety reasons whereas the same applies to animal manure in general.

In bioremediation 
The larvae of Hermetia illucens were used in a bioremediation experiment, in which they utilized up to 49% of dry weight corn leaves polluted with cadmium or zinc after 36 days. Artificially polluted corn leaves serves here as a model plant material comparable to plant biomass polluted as a result of phytoextraction. The 49% loss of polluted dry weight is a better result than in the case of composting, which is one of the standard proposed pretreatments for biomass polluted after phytoextraction. The type of heavy metal did not affect the degree of utilization. Cadmium mostly accumulates in the puparium, while zinc accumulates in the adult fly.

The use of insect for bioremediation is named entomoremediation.

Farming

Larval colonies 
The main difficulty is obtaining black soldier fly larvae or eggs to start or replenish the colony. This is usually done by enticing the soldier flies to lay eggs in small holes over the grub bin. Adult flies lay clusters of eggs in the edges of corrugated cardboard or corrugated plastic. In some regions, it is possible to start or maintain adequate larvae colonies from native soldier flies; however, pest species such as houseflies and blowflies are also drawn to many of the foods used to attract soldier flies (such as fermented chicken feed).

In tropical or subtropical climates, they might breed year-round, but in other climates, a greenhouse may be needed to obtain eggs in the cooler periods. The grubs are quite hardy and can handle more acidic conditions and higher temperatures than redworms. Larvae can survive cold winters, particularly with large numbers of grubs, insulation, or compost heat (generated by the microorganisms in the grub bin or compost pile). Heat stimulates the grubs to crawl off, pupate, and hatch, and a great deal of light and heat seem to be required for breeding. Many small-scale grub farmers build their larval colonies from eggs deposited by wild soldier flies.

Space and shape 
Newly emerged soldier flies perform the beginning of their mating ritual in flight. The male grabs onto the female, and then grasps the female's ovipositor with his genitals. They mate while stationary and connected.

German scientists have successfully bred soldier flies in a space as small as 10 liters.

Heat 

Light 
Quartz-iodine lamps have been successfully used to stimulate mating of adults. In tropical conditions, morning direct sunlight is optimal for emergence, mating, and egglaying, with indirect sunlight often preferred before and after mating.

Humidity 
Humidity at 70% is considered optimal for all stages of their lifecycle.

Substrate was found to be unnecessary for pupation, but substrate is thought to act as a regulator for humidity which prevents desiccation. A 93% emergence rate was observed when humidity was held at 70%.

Black soldier fly larvae and redworms 
Worm farmers often get larvae in their worm bins. Larvae are best at quickly converting "high-nutrient" waste into animal feed. Redworms are better at converting high-cellulose materials (paper, cardboard, leaves, plant materials except wood) into an excellent soil amendment.

Redworms thrive on the residue produced by the fly larvae, but larvae leachate ("tea") contains enzymes and tends to be too acidic for worms. Most attempts to raise large numbers of larvae with redworms in the same container, at the same time, are unsuccessful. Worms have been able to survive in/under grub bins when the bottom is the ground. Redworms can live in grub bins when a large number of larvae are not present. Worms can be added if the larval population gets low (in the cold season) and worms can be raised in grub bins while awaiting eggs from wild black soldier flies.

As a feeder species, BSFL are not known to be intermediate hosts of parasitic worms that infect poultry, while redworms are host to many.

Names and trademarks 

BSFL were developed as a feeder insect for exotic pets by D. Craig Sheppard, who named the larvae Phoenix Worms and began marketing them as pet food. In 2006, "Phoenix Worms" became the first feeder insect to be granted a U.S. registered trademark. Other companies also market BSFL under such brand names as NutriGrubs, Soldier Grubs, Reptiworms, Calciworms, BIOgrubs, and Obie's Worms (Canada). In Africa they are marketed as live feeder, meal and oil by ProtiCycle for animal feed, pet food for dogs and cats as well as food for fish such as tilapia and catfish.

Possible natural enemies 
In West Africa, Dirhinus giffardii has been found to be a parasitoid of H. illucens pupae and decrease egg production. It has been found to reduce stocks by up to 72%. The parasite is carried by the wasps and precautions should be taken to protect the larvae from exposure to these wasps.

See also 
 Black fly
 Insect farming
 Insects as feed

References

External links 
 Bioconversion of Food Waste : Black Soldier fly
 'Grubby' Research Promises Environmental, Economic Benefits
 Black soldier fly on the UF / IFAS Featured Creatures website

Stratiomyidae
Edible insects
Insects as feed
Insect rearing
Fodder
Composting
Flies described in 1758
Diptera of North America
Taxa named by Carl Linnaeus